Richard Pelletier (born 30 November 1988) is a French footballer who currently plays for Angoulême CFC in the Championnat de France amateur 2.

Career

Europe
Pelletier was a member of the youth setup at his hometown team, Chamois Niortais, and later with Angers SCO, before signing his first professional contract in 2007.

Pelletier spent the first 3 years of his career playing for the Brest in Ligue 2, leaving in 2010 before he made a first team appearance for the club. He spent a short period on loan with La Vitréenne during the spring of 2010, before moving to Canada.

North America
On 9 August 2010 Pelletier signed a 2-year deal with the Montreal Impact of USSF Division 2, along with his compatriot Anthony Le Gall. He made his debut for Impact on 11 August 2010 against Crystal Palace Baltimore.

CFA
On 20 September 2011 returned to France and signed with Championnat de France amateur club Stade Plabennecois.

CFA 2
In June 2013, he signed for Angoulême CFC in Championnat de France amateur 2.

Career stats

References

External links
 Richard Pelletier joueur LA VITRÉENNE ::: Vitréenne Football Club

1988 births
Living people
Sportspeople from Brest, France
French footballers
Ligue 2 players
USSF Division 2 Professional League players
North American Soccer League players
Chamois Niortais F.C. players
Angers SCO players
Stade Brestois 29 players
Montreal Impact (1992–2011) players
La Vitréenne FC players
Stade Plabennécois players
Association football defenders
Footballers from Brittany